Galshar (also Gal-Shar, Buyant) is a sum (district) of Khentii Province in eastern Mongolia. Sum center former location was 41 33 49 16N 110 46 04 16 E. In 2010, its population was 1,807.

References 

Districts of Khentii Province